This is a list of films produced in Brazil in 2019:

References

External links
 Brazilian films of 2019 at the Internet Movie Database

2019
Brazil